Romangordo is a municipality located in the province of Cáceres, Extremadura, Spain. According to the 2008 census (INE), the municipality has a population of 206 inhabitants.

References

External links

  romangordo.org is the official website of Romangordo (only in Spanish).
  romangordo.info has many articles on Romangordo (local news, history, flora,...)

Municipalities in the Province of Cáceres